The Flavius C. Coles Farmhouse is a historic site in Tallahassee, Florida. It is located at 411 Oakland Avenue. On January 7, 1992, it was added to the U.S. National Register of Historic Places.

References

External links

 Leon County listings at National Register of Historic Places
 Leon County listings at Florida's Office of Cultural and Historical Programs

Historic buildings and structures in Leon County, Florida
National Register of Historic Places in Tallahassee, Florida
History of Tallahassee, Florida
Houses in Tallahassee, Florida
Farms on the National Register of Historic Places in Florida